Akancha Srivastava, is the founder of Akancha Srivastava Foundation. The Foundation was formed in 2017. It is an 80G certified, non-profit organization in India that works for the education and empowerment of people by imparting the knowledge of cyber safety via its initiative Akancha Against Harassment .

History 
Akancha Srivastava founded the non-profit organisation in 2017 after a personal experience that involved severe cyber stalking. She decided to take up this cause & build India's movement against cyber harassment.

Foundation has conducted workshops across schools, colleges, universities, and Co working spaces across the country. Indian Police has collaborated with them in knowledge creation and addressing complaints. Educators and IAS officers have joined hands with them too.

Activities 
The "Akancha Against Harassment" social impact initiative fights cyber harassment and empowers people to protect themselves from cyber harassment in all its forms like- cyber stalking, bullying, cyber grooming, morphing, blackmail, acts of voyeurism, revenge pornography & impostering. Foundation has several tools for enabling this such as the 24x7 helpline which is recognized and supported by Indian police across states. The organisation creates awareness through:

 Chatbot - launched in 2018, the chatbot educates about cyber harassment and steps to be taken to counter it. SOS option is available to connect with the foundation.
 Workshops - conducted in schools, colleges, and other institutions.
 Podcasts - Podcasts have guests from The Indian Police, IAS officers, Educators, Lawyers, Mental Health Professionals & fitness experts who share/address/guide on different aspects of cyber safety and inform about citizen rights and laws.

The NGO's board of advisors include Karnataka's Inspector General of Police D Roopa Moudgil, UP's Inspector General of Police Navniet Sekera, PayTM founder Vijay Shekhar Sharma, Maharashtra's Inspector General of Police Krishna Prakash, MP of Rajsamand Princess Diya Kumari, and Innov8 founder Ritesh Malik. This NGO helps victims of cyber harassment connect with police and other authorities.

References

External links 
 

Cyberattacks
Internet bots
2017 establishments in Maharashtra
Non-profit organisations based in India